The Capitals Limited was a named passenger train operating in the United Kingdom.

History
After the Second World War the Flying Scotsman was re-instated as an intermediate stop train, instead of holding its former position as the non-stop London to Edinburgh service. British Rail introduced a new summer-only non-stop express called the Capitals Limited on 23 May 1949 which was scheduled to leave King's Cross at 9.30am, with the service in the return direction leaving Edinburgh at 9.45am. The journey time was 8 hours.

In 1951 the service was accelerated to offer a journey time between Edinburgh and London of 7 hours 20 minutes. In 1953, the train was renamed the Elizabethan, to mark the coronation of Queen Elizabeth II, and at the same time the journey was reduced to 6 hours 45 minutes.

References

Named passenger trains of British Rail
Railway services introduced in 1949
1949 establishments in England